Uncle, Duke & The Chief is the fifth studio album by Canadian rock band Born Ruffians, released on February 16, 2018, by Paper Bag Records in Canada and Yep Roc Records worldwide.

Track listing

References

External links
Born Ruffians website

2018 albums
Born Ruffians albums
Paper Bag Records albums
Yep Roc Records albums